The Brothers Fault Zone (BFZ) is the most notable of a set of northwest-trending fault zones including the Eugene–Denio, McLoughlin, and Vale zones that dominate the geological structure of most of Oregon.  These are also representative of a regional pattern of generally northwest-striking geological features ranging from Walker Lane on the California–Nevada border to the Olympic–Wallowa Lineament in Washington; these are generally associated with the regional extension and faulting of the Basin and Range Province, of which the BFZ is considered the northern boundary.

The relationships with other features is complex. Lavas associated with the Nevada Rift have been dated to 16.3 Ma (millions of years ago), close to the inception of basin-and-range faulting, but there is a suspicion that the rifting developed on an older strike-slip fault, possibly connected with the East Pacific Rise.

At its west end, just past the Newberry Volcano, the BFZ terminates at the north-striking Sisters Fault, part of the High Cascades geological province.

At a possibly more fundamental level, the Brothers, Eugene–Denio, and McLoughlin zones, and possibly the Vale zone, all terminate near the Klamath – Blue Mountains Lineament (KBML; shortened and slightly misplaced on the map at right). It coincides with the southern boundary of the Columbia Embayment (the Olympic–Wallowa Lineament in Washington being the northern boundary), a region noticeably lacking in pre-Tertiary bedrock. Aside from aligning with the northwestern edge of several terranes that have accreted to the North American continent (such as the Klamath Mountains on the southern coast of Oregon, and Blue Mountains Province just north of the BFZ), the KBML has no apparent surface manifestation; it is believed to reflect a deeper structure, possible a pre-Tertiary continental margin.

The BFZ is the northern edge of the Basin and Range Province, a region of northwest directed extension, wherefore the BFZ also accommodates the offset with the Blue Mountains Province.  It does this not by through-going strike-slip faulting (such as with the San Andreas fault to the south) but by a series of hundreds of en echelon normal faults somewhat crosswise to the zone itself. Such faulting is believed to be the surface manifestation of a deeper shear zone.

The Brothers Fault Zone is also the locus of the High Lava Plains (HLP) volcanism of central and southeastern Oregon. HLP volcanism is notable for showing an age progression from 16 Ma at its eastern end (near the Oregon–Nevada–Idaho corner) to the active Newberry Volcano at its western end.  This age progression mirrors the very similar progression along the track of the Yellowstone Hotspot, which appears to have a common origin.  Also closely related in space and time is the eruption of the 16.6 Ma Steens Basalts, the initial and most voluminous phase of the Columbia River Basalt Group lava flows that blanket eastern Oregon and the entire southeastern quarter of Washington.  These also show a similar age progression to the north; there is a great deal of debate on how all of these are related, and how they initiated.  The track of the Yellowstone Hotspot is neatly explained by motion of the North American craton over a plume (hotspot) of material rising from the mantle.  But this explanation fails for the so-called "Newberry hotspot" track, which lies oblique to the motion of the craton.  One suggestion is that the large blob of molten rock at the head of the plume was sheared off by the advancing edge of the craton, and remained entrained in front of the craton to melt the lithosphere in a broad region, while the tail of the plume was overrun to make the Yellowstone Hotspot track.  Age progressive volcanism along the Brothers Fault Zone (as well as the Steens Fault and North Nevada Rift) results from the expanding lithospheric melt opportunistically exploiting existing crustal faults.

In summary, the Brothers Fault Zone, and the related Eugene–Denio, McLoughlin, and Vale zones, appear to be deep-seated structures in accreted terranes bounded by the Klamath—Blue Mountains Lineament, which has been reactivated by Basin and Range extension, and exploited by mid-Miocene volcanism associated with the Yellowstone Hotspot.

Notes

References 

 

 

Geology of Oregon
Seismic faults of Oregon